Salina Area Technical College is a public technical college in Salina, Kansas, United States. The college is coordinated by the Kansas Board of Regents and regionally accredited by the Higher Learning Commission. It has been in operation since 1965 and offers associate degrees, diplomas, and certificates.

History
Salina Area Technical College opened in 1965 on the former Schilling Air Force Base with 189 students enrolled in nine programs.

From 1965 to 2008, Salina Tech was known as the Salina Area Vocational Technical School, and was part of the Salina School District. In 2008, it became an independent technical college. In November 2016, the college earned its accreditation from the Higher Learning Commission.

In the fall of 2019, the college had nearly 800 students, an increase of 69 percent in the past five years.

References

External links
 

Public universities and colleges in Kansas
Education in Salina, Kansas
Educational institutions established in 1965
1965 establishments in Kansas
Two-year colleges in the United States